Elliot Junction railway station served the hamlet of Elliot, Angus, Scotland from 1866 to 1967 on the Dundee and Arbroath Railway.

History 
The station was opened in October 1866 by the Caledonian Railway. Elliot goods was nearby and there was a loop just after the level crossing. An accident occurred on 28 December 1906 when a train stood at the station was hit by another train. 22 people were killed and 8 were injured. The station closed on 1 January 1917 but reopened in September 1917, although it was only open on Saturdays. It fully reopened on 1 January 1918, before permanently closing on 4 September 1967.

References 

Disused railway stations in Angus, Scotland
Former Dundee and Arbroath Railway stations
Railway stations in Great Britain opened in 1866
Railway stations in Great Britain closed in 1967
1866 establishments in Scotland
1967 disestablishments in Scotland
Beeching closures in Scotland